Lokesh Kumar (born 29 June 1989) is an Indian film director, producer and screenwriter. He made an award-winning Tamil language feature film My Son Is Gay.

Life and career
Lokesh Kumar was born on 29 June 1989 in Chennai, Tamil Nadu (India). He did his schooling in Kalashetra Matriculation and Higher Secondary School, Chennai, after which he went to study Mechanical Engineering at S.A. Polytechnic College. After college he worked in the corporate sector for a few years. In 2013, he quit his corporate job and started making independent films. He made few experimental short films and by 2014, he decided to make a gay themed feature film which dealt with a teenage boy coming out to his mother, the film went through a lot of issues and delayed. By 2016, the film was fully completed with the help of an NRI producer Anil Saxena. His film My Son Is Gay is the first Tamil feature film on gay relationship in the 100 years of Tamil Cinema existence. The film was screened in several international film festivals and earned him many awards.

Filmography

References

External links 
 Lokesh Kumar on IMDd

Living people
1989 births
Tamil film directors
Indian film directors
Indian male screenwriters
Indian screenwriters
Indian film producers